Edward Tiffin Cook Sr. (November 27, 1888 – October 18, 1972) was an American athlete who shared the gold medal in the pole vault (with Alfred Carlton Gilbert) at the 1908 Summer Olympics.

Cook was an all-around athlete and won the IC4A long jump title in 1908 and 1909, and the AAU pole vault title in 1907 and 1911. He graduated from Cornell University in 1910 and later became a farmer and director of the First National Bank in his native Chillicothe, Ohio. He was elected to the Sphinx Head Society during his senior year.

References

1888 births
1972 deaths
Sportspeople from Chillicothe, Ohio
American male pole vaulters
Athletes (track and field) at the 1908 Summer Olympics
Cornell University alumni
Olympic gold medalists for the United States in track and field
Medalists at the 1908 Summer Olympics